Sitwell is a surname. Notable people with the surname include:

 A member of the Sitwell literary family:
 Edith Sitwell
 Osbert Sitwell
 Sacheverell Sitwell
 The Sitwell Baronets, holders of a hereditary baronetcy awarded by the British Crown
Sir Sitwell Sitwell, 1st Baronet
Sir George Sitwell, 2nd Baronet
Sir Sitwell Reresby Sitwell, 3rd Baronet
Sir George Reresby Sitwell, 4th Baronet
Sir (Francis) Osbert Sitwell, 5th Baronet
Sir Sacheverell Sitwell, 6th Baronet
Sir Sacheverell Reresby Sitwell, 7th Baronet
Sir George Reresby Sitwell, 8th Baronet

Fictional characters
 Jasper Sitwell, a comic book espionage agent in the Marvel Comics universe
 Stan Sitwell, a character from the Fox television comedy series Arrested Development

English-language surnames